Peristerovrachoi ("pigeon rocks"), are uninhabited Greek islets/rocks, in the Aegean Sea, close to the eastern coast of Crete. Administratively they lie within the Itanos municipality of Lasithi.

See also
List of islands of Greece

Landforms of Lasithi
Uninhabited islands of Crete
Islands of Greece